Stephan Kekulé von Stradonitz (1 May 1863, in Ghent – 5 May 1933, in Berlin), was a German lawyer, heraldist and genealogist who popularized a genealogical numbering system of ancestors.

Stephan was the son of the prominent chemist Friedrich August Kekulé von Stradonitz, descended from a Czech noble family from Bohemia, and his Belgian wife Stéphanie Drory.

In 1898 Kekulé von Stradonitz published his interpretation of Eytzinger's and Sosa's method in his Ahnentafel-Atlas. Ahnentafeln zu 32 Ahnen der Regenten Europas und ihrer Gemahlinnen, Berlin: J. A. Stargardt, 1898–1904, containing 79 charts of the sovereigns of Europe and their wives. This method became the most common method of numbering ancestors and is known as the Sosa–Stradonitz Method or Ahnentafel.

External links
 The Sosa–Stradonitz System or Ahnentafel Numbering System

1863 births
1933 deaths
German genealogists
German untitled nobility
German male non-fiction writers